Dianthus lusitanus is a species of Dianthus native to the Iberian Peninsula, and to the Atlas Mountains of Morocco and Algeria. A hardy tussock-forming perennial growing on rocky slopes, in times past its numerous stems were used to make brooms.

Subspecies
A subspecies has been described:

Dianthus lusitanus subsp. sidi-tualii (Font Quer) Dobignard

References

lusitanus
Plants described in 1804